Gordon Thompson may refer to:
Gordon Thompson (songwriter), songwriter who co-wrote "The Thing-Ummy Bob" with David Heneker
Gordon Thompson Jr. (1929–2015), U.S. federal judge
Gordon R. Thompson (1918–1995), Chief Justice of the Supreme Court of Nevada

See also
Gordon Thomson (disambiguation)